The Colonel Franciszek Sadowski Land Forces Training Centre in Drawsko, commonly known as the Drawsko Training Ground is a training and proving ground located approximately  southwest of Drawsko Pomorskie, West Pomeranian Voivodeship. The training ground was established on 2 February 1946. Aside from being used by the Polish Army, it is also used by all member states of NATO.

History 
The unit originated in Jelenino, a village near Szczecinek and was created on 2 February 1946 as the Command of the Artillery Proving Ground. The unit was moved on 12 January 1949 to Oleszno, where it currently lies. The base was then changed to both a proving and training ground. Eventually, the name of the ground changed to the 2nd District Artillery Training Ground.

Many military events happened and happen in the area, most notably "Odra - Nysa 69", "Tarcza 76" and "Tarcza 88". In October 2000, the V Corps of the United States participated in a field exercise codenamed "VICTORY STRIKE". More than 2 thousand soldiers participated in the event.

Settlements located in the area 
The training ground's area itself is located in Drawsko County, on the border of Gmina Kalisz Pomorski and Gmina Drawsko Pomorskie. The settlements on the area are:
 Gmina Kalisz Pomorski
 Głębokie
 Prostynia
 Jaworze
 Borowo
 Czertyń
 Gmina Drawsko Pomorskie
 Oleszno (headquarters)
 Ziemsko
 Żołędowo
 Dzikowo
 Konotop

Commanders 
The commanders of the area were and are:

 Maj.  (1946–1950)
 Lt. Col. Jan Sementz (1950–1962)
 Brig. Gen. Leon Dubicki (March–September 1962)
 Lt. Franciszek Raban (1962–1964)
 Brig. Gen. Józef Kolasa (1964–1966)
 Lt. Jan Bodylewicz (1966–1974)
 Lt. Franciszek Sadowski (1974–1979)
 Lt. Jan Matejuk (1988–1996)
 Lt. Jan Krupa (1996–1998)
 Lt. Robert Jabłoński (1998–2001)
 Lt. Antoni Budkowski (2001–2004)
 Lt. Michał Wałęza (2004–2010)
 Lt. Marek Gmurski (2010–present)

Notes and references 

Military training areas
Proving grounds
Drawsko County
Polish Land Forces
1946 establishments in Poland
Buildings and structures in West Pomeranian Voivodeship